St Patrick's Church is a parish church of the Church of England in Jurby parish, near the northwest coast of the Isle of Man. Scotland and Ireland can be seen across the Irish Sea on a moderately clear day. The church also has views down the west coast to Peel, across the northern plain of the island, and to the central hills.

History

A small 8th century chapel a few hundred yards to the south-west was Jurby's first recorded church. In medieval times the church was part of the Whithorn diocese in south-western Scotland. At one point while the English and Scots were at war, the local bishop invited the Scottish clergy of Jurby to visit him. The bishop was criticised by English authorities for fraternising with the enemy. The medieval church was built in the 12th century, which replaced the chapel.

On 12 June 1812 the parishioners successfully petitioned the Crown to replace their small church with a larger one. The church was to consist of pews separated by a central aisle, 36 pews on either side, each pew to hold eight individuals. Ground was broken on the new church, which would become the present-day St Patrick's, in 1813, and the structure was finally completed in 1829. There are several Viking carved crosses/gravestones within the church, including the Sigurd Cross. The churchyard contains a Norse burial mound.

The church is located on slightly raised ground, with views across the Irish Sea to both Ireland and Scotland, south-west towards Peel, towards the northern plain of the island, as well as to the central hills.

There are a number of war graves, for British, Commonwealth and Polish servicemen. Many of these died at the nearby RAF Jurby training base during World War II, as did many members of the SOE, also based in Jurby.

As part of a new initiative for Jurby, the Rev'd William Mackay (formerly curate of the Parish of the Northern Plain) was installed as Minister to Jurby Church and Community by the Lord Bishop, at a service held on Friday 8 November 2019, in Jurby Church. (Under a Bishop's Mission Order, Jurby is effectively no longer part of the Parish of the Northern Plain.) Rev. Mackay's first service in his new role was to conduct the Remembrance Service in St Patrick's, Jurby on 10 November 2019.

Gallery

See also
 Diocese of Sodor and Man
 Bishop of Sodor and Man
 Pasages (steam trawler)

References

External links
 Isle of Man Building Control Districts showing parish boundaries

Churches in the Isle of Man
Churches completed in 1829
Religious organizations disestablished in 2015
Church of England church buildings in Europe